David Laverne Williams (born August 10, 1945) is a former wide receiver who had a ten year career in the National Football League and the World Football League. He was the first player signed by the Seattle Seahawks in 1975.

Williams was an All-American for the University of Washington in  football and track, as a decathlete. He was inducted into the Husky Hall of Fame in 2014.

Following his pro football career, Williams has been an executive working in property management for more than four decades. He helped to establish a church on Kauai in 2001, which met in a tent until the North Shore Christian Church building was completed in 2014.

Early life and education 
Born in Cedar Rapids, Iowa, Williams was the fourth of seven children of Joseph Laverne Williams and Cleo Maye (née Hill) Williams. His family moved in the winter of 1951–1952 to Tacoma, Washington, where they lived near his paternal grandparents.

His older brothers Joe and Jerry played football, and they introduced him to playing the game in their front yard. Williams recounts how Jerry played catch with him and taught him ball drills: "We would be ten yards away from each other and begin by throwing the ball to each other from many angles and positions. He would find my weakest positions and work on those even more." At the end of the drill, they did ten pushups for every dropped ball.

In Tacoma, Williams attended the former Hawthorne Elementary School, Gault Junior High School, and Lincoln High School, where he graduated in 1963. He earned a total of twelve high school varsity letters: three in football, three in basketball, three in decathlon, and three in track and field.  He also played on the 1962 Connie Mack Cheney Studs baseball team.

Collegiate sports career: football and track 
Williams earned six varsity letters at the University of Washington, three in football, where he played tight end, and three in track, in an era when freshmen were not eligible for varsity teams. Coaches of the PAC-8 named Williams to the 1965 All-Pacific Athletic Conference team.

As a freshman, in his first decathlon in 1965 he qualified for the National AAU Decathlon Championships, and placed 14th among 30 competitors in the Olympic tryouts.

Williams received his baccalaureate degree in 1973 at the University of Washington. He was named to the Washington's Husky Hall of Fame 2014 class.

Professional football career 
Williams was a professional football player for ten seasons, eight as a wide receiver in the NFL, and two seasons as a wide receiver in the World Football League. During his pro career, he caught 183 passes for 2,768 yards and 25 touchdowns in the NFL.

He was also the first player signed by the Seattle Seahawks, and worked for the team as a spokesman during their start-up year, but never played for the Seahawks due to a knee injury.

St. Louis Cardinals, 1967–1971 
Williams was the first draft pick of the Cardinals, the sixteenth overall pick in the first round in 1967 NFL draft. He was a wide receiver for five seasons for St. Louis, starting in 53 of 67 games in which he played, catching 162 passes, and receiving for a total of 22 touchdowns. He was in tenth place on the 1968 NFL leaderboard for 56.8 receiving yards per game. In 1969, he made fifth place on the NFL leaderboard, with 56 receptions.

San Diego Chargers, 1972–1973 
In 1972 Williams was traded to the Chargers, where he met and formed a friendship with Johnny Unitas. He played in 12 games, starting in 6.

Pittsburgh Steelers, 1973 
The Steelers claimed Williams on waivers from the Chargers in 1973. He played in one regular season game, and in a playoff game. The Steelers released him from his contract in the spring of 1974.

Southern California Sun, 1974–1975 
Williams reported to the Southern California Sun training camp on June 5, 1973. He played his last pro football in the World Football League, with two seasons at the Southern California Sun, and he scored a total of twenty touchdowns. Williams is credited with holding the players together throughout the winter of 1975 when they had not received paychecks since the previous September. Club president Larry Hatfield said, "But we would have lost a lot more [players] without the job Dave did. His role in keeping the team together was extremely substantial He took the time to understand our problems in depth and convey them to the players."

Seattle Seahawks, 1976 
Williams was the first to sign with the Seahawks in the fall of 1975, and he worked as spokesman and assistant to the general manager. He gave over 90 presentations promoting the Seahawks to organizations throughout the Pacific Northwest. He injured his left knee in a promotional event prior to the start of their first season in 1976, and retired from professional football in the fall of 1976.

Later life and career 
In the mid-1980s, Gene Upshaw contacted Williams to head the steering committee for the new NFL Retired Players Association (RPA), and he chaired the association from 1984 through 1988. The purpose of the RPA was to provide "powerful national advocacy and collegial support for retired professional football players, their families and the community at large". As spokesman for the RPA, Williams pointed out that half of the 120 retired players in the Pro Football Hall of Fame in Canton, Ohio, had no pension. Subsequently, the NFL Players Association asked Commissioner Pete Rozelle and the League to "give pensions to the players who pioneered the game."

Since leaving professional football, Williams has had a career of more than forty years in property management, a business he began while playing for the Chargers. Williams has been an executive for multi-unit property management companies, including Equity Residential and Apartment Investment and Management Company, among others. He and his wife Sherry incorporated "David L. Williams Management Consultants, LLC" in 1999.

Faith and memoir publication 
Williams and his wife helped found an evangelical Christian church on Kauai in 2001. They served as Deacons and Church treasurers and worshipped in a tent for years. North Shore Christian Church was built thirteen years later and opened in January 2014. In 2017, Williams published his life story, combined with stories he had transcribed from tapes of his father's memories, entitled My Best for Him, My Memoir.

Athletic records, honors and awards 
Williams' high school football kudos included all-city, all-conference, and all-state honors in both junior and senior years; the State of Washington's 1963 AA 120 hurdles champion; High School football All American in senior year; team captain senior year; and he was ultimately named to The Seattle Times High School Football Team of the Century in 1999.

He won national collegiate honors both in football and in track and field events. In his junior year, Williams was named to the Associated Press All-America football second-team for 1965.  The Associated Press also honored him In 1966 with All-America honorable mention in football, and he won fourth place at the NCAA in the 440-yard hurdles, as well as sixth place in the 120-yard hurdles. He was on the 4x110-yard relay team at the 1967 NCAAs that won fifth place.  Williams completed his university career in 1967, making second-team All-America (Associated Press), first-team All-Pacific Coast and he had been invited to the 1966 East–West Shrine Game, 1967 Hula Bowl, and 1967 Chicago College All-Star Game. Williams was also a four-time All-American in track and field. Between 1964–1967, he earned six collegiate varsity letters.

The Husky Hall of Fame lists Williams' records that have stood for more than half a century: "[He] still holds the UW records for receiving yards in a game with 257 vs. UCLA in 1965; for receptions by a tight end in a game with 10 (twice in 1965, vs. both UCLA and Stanford); receiving TDs in a season by a tight end (10, 1965); and for career receiving yards per catch by a tight end (18.3)"

See also
 Washington Huskies football statistical leaders

References

External links 
 2014 Husky Hall of Fame Ceremony (video, Williams' award and acceptance, from 1:19:08 –1:29:36)
 

1945 births
Living people
Sportspeople from Cedar Rapids, Iowa
American football wide receivers
Washington Huskies football players
St. Louis Cardinals (football) players
San Diego Chargers players
Pittsburgh Steelers players
Southern California Sun players
Seattle Seahawks players
American business executives
American football tight ends
American male decathletes
Washington Huskies men's track and field athletes
Track and field athletes in the National Football League
Players of American football from Tacoma, Washington